Hanging Lake straddles the international border between the United States and Canada. Most of the lake is located in North Cascades National Park, Washington, but the northern section of the lake as well as the drainage are in Chilliwack Lake Provincial Park, British Columbia. Hanging Lake is less than  ENE of Middle Peak.

References

Lakes of Washington (state)
North Cascades National Park
Lakes of Whatcom County, Washington
International lakes of North America